Lady Worsley may refer to:

 Ursula St. Barbe (d. 1602)
 Seymour Dorothy Fleming (1758-1818) whose life was dramatised in the 2015 television film, The Scandalous Lady W
 Alexandra Pelham, Lady Worsley (1890-1963)
 Caroline, Lady Worsley (b. 1934)